Coviriali District is one of nine districts of Satipo Province in the Department of Junín, Peru.

Coviriali has a tropical rainforest climate similar to that of nearby Satipo. Precipitation is adequate in all months although less is received in the austral winter months of June through August. Coviriali's climate under the Köppen Classification is Af (borderline Am, tropical monsoon).

References

1965 establishments in Peru
States and territories established in 1965